Estadio Carlos Tartiere was a multi-use stadium in Oviedo, Spain. It was initially used as the stadium of Real Oviedo matches. It was replaced by the New Carlos Tartiere in 2000.

History
Originally known as Buenavista stadium, named after the neighbourhood, it was inaugurated on April 24, 1932 with a match between the national teams of Spain and Yugoslavia. The first goal in this stadium was scored by Real Oviedo's forward Isidro Lángara.

The stadium was dedicated to the memory of the first president and founder of Real Oviedo, Carlos Tartiere in 1958.

It was completely rebuilt for the 1982 FIFA World Cup. It hosted three matches.

Pop superstar Michael Jackson performed at the stadium during his Dangerous World Tour on September 21, 1992 in front of 25,000 people. Guitarist Slash made a special appearance during the show on "Black or White".

The last match played in this stadium took place on May 20, 2000 and it was a Primera División match against Real Sociedad.

The capacity of the stadium was initially 22,500, but it was reduced to 16,500 in 1998 when the stadium became all-seater. This was the reason to build a new stadium.

It was replaced by the current Estadio Carlos Tartiere in 2000 and was eventually demolished in 2003.

1982 FIFA World Cup 
The stadium hosted three games in the 1982 FIFA World Cup:

References

External links
Stadium history
Stadium picture 
Estadios de Espana 

Real Oviedo
Carlos Tertiere
1982 FIFA World Cup stadiums
Sports venues completed in 1932
Sports venues demolished in 2003